Rebelde Way (lit. Rebel Way) is a Portuguese youth telenovela broadcast on SIC based on an Argentine soap opera of the same name.

Cast
 Joana Anes as Mia Rossi
 Joana Alvarenga as Elisabete "Lisa" Marie Valentino Scott
 Nelson Antunes as Manuel Guerreiro
 Tiago Barroso as Pedro Silva Lobo
 Ana Rita Tristão as Íris Fernandes
 Hélder Agapito as Guilherme "Gui" Carlos Silva
 Maria Albergaria as Frederica "Kika" Vasconcelos
 Marco Medeiros as Gabriel Pereira
 Joana Santos as Vitória "Vicky" Paz
 Tiago Aldeia as Marco Aguiar
 Joana Cotrim as Elsa Lima
 Tomás Alves as Tomás Moreira
 Inês Aires Pereira as Paula Castelão
 João Godinho as Rodrigo Salavisa
 Raquel Strada as Sofia Bragança
 Francisco Froes as Álvaro Manso
 Diogo Martins as António "Toni/Alergias" Marques
 Jani Zhao as Hoshi Kyoko
 Diogo Ferreira as Luís Miguel "Gordo" Ferreira
 Ana Marta Ferreira as Milagros "Mili" Perez

External links

2008 telenovelas
2008 Portuguese television series debuts
2009 Portuguese television series endings
Portuguese telenovelas
Children's telenovelas
Teen telenovelas
Sociedade Independente de Comunicação telenovelas
Portuguese-language telenovelas
Television series about teenagers